Klaus-Peter Creter (born April 8, 1943) is a German politician of the Christian Democratic Union (CDU) and former member of the German Bundestag.

Life 
Creter joined the GDR CDU in 1972, where he was local chairman, later deputy district chairman and from 1989 on district chairman in the city of Gera. In 1990, he was elected to the last Volkskammer, after which he was a member of the Bundestag for three months.

Literature

References

1943 births
Members of the Bundestag for Thuringia
Members of the Bundestag 1987–1990
Members of the Bundestag for the Christian Democratic Union of Germany
Members of the 10th Volkskammer
Living people